DYRX (103.7 FM), broadcasting as 103.7 Star FM, is a radio station owned and operated by Bombo Radyo Philippines through its licensee People's Broadcasting Service, Inc. Its studio, offices and transmitter are located at Bombo Radyo Broadcast Center, Arnaldo Blvd., Roxas, Capiz.

References

External links
Star FM Roxas FB Page
Star FM Roxas Website

Radio stations in Capiz
Radio stations established in 1993
Bombo Radyo Philippines